George Brock Chisholm  (18 May 1896 – 4 February 1971) was a Canadian psychiatrist, medical practitioner, World War I veteran, and the first director-general of the World Health Organization (WHO). He was the 13th Canadian Surgeon General and the recipient of numerous accolades, including 
Order of Canada, Order of the British Empire, Military Cross, and Efficiency Decoration.

Background
Brock Chisholm was born on 18 May 1896, in Oakville, Ontario, to a family with deep ties to the region. Under Sir Isaac Brock, his great-grandfather fought against the Americans during the War of 1812.  His great grandfather’s brother, William, was Oakville’s founder.  His father was Frank Chisholm, who ran a coal yard. He had a Presbyterian upbringing.

Career

Canada
In 1915 during the First World War, age 18, Chisholm joined the Canadian Expeditionary Force, serving in the 15th Battalion, CEF as a cook, sniper, machine gunner and scout. His leadership and heroism were twice rewarded (after being twice wounded): with a Military Cross for his efforts in a battle outside of Lens, France; and the Bar. He rose to the rank of captain, was injured once, and returned home in 1917.

After the war, Chisholm pursued his lifelong passion of medicine, earning his MD from the University of Toronto by 1924 before interning in England, where he specialized in psychiatry. After six years in private practice in his native Oakville, he attended Yale University where he specialized in the mental health of children. During this time, Chisholm developed his strong view that children should be raised in an "as intellectually free environment" as possible, independent of the prejudices and biases (political, moral and religious) of their parents.

At the outbreak of the Second World War, Chisholm rapidly rose in stature within the Canadian military and government. He joined the war effort as a psychiatrist dealing with psychological aspects of soldier training, before rising to the rank of Director General Medical Services, the highest position within the medical ranks of the Canadian Army. He was the first psychiatrist to head the medical ranks of any army in the world.

In 1944, the Canadian Government created the position of Deputy Minister of Health. Chisholm was the first person to occupy the post and held it until 1946.

WHO

In 1946, Chisholm became executive secretary of the Interim Commission of the World Health Organization (WHO), based in Geneva, Switzerland. The WHO succeeded the League of Nations's Health Organization.  Chishom was one of 16 international experts consulted in drafting the agency's first constitution. He recommended the WHO's name, with emphasis on "world."  He defined health for the WHO as "a state of complete physical, mental, and social well-being and not merely the absence of disease or infirmity."  The WHO charter also established that health is a fundamental human right and that "the health of all peoples is fundamental to the attainment of peace and security."

The WHO became a permanent UN fixture in April 1948, and Chisholm became the agency's first Director General on a 46–2 vote. Chisholm was now in the unique position of being able to bring his views on the importance of international mental and physical health to the world. Refusing re-election, he occupied the post until 1953, during which time the WHO dealt successfully with a cholera epidemic in Egypt, malaria outbreaks in Greece and Sardinia, and introduced shortwave epidemic-warning services for ships at sea.

Later career

Chisholm served as president of the World Federation of Mental Health (1957–58).

Beliefs

Chisholm was a controversial public speaker who nevertheless spoke with great conviction, and drew much criticism from the Canadian public for comments inspired by his communist beliefs in the mid-1940s that children should not be encouraged to believe in Santa Claus, the Bible or anything he regarded as supernaturalism. Calls for his resignation as Deputy Minister of Health were quelled by his appointment as Executive Secretary of the WHO, but his public perception as "Canada's most famously articulate angry man" lingered.

Religious and other conservative writers and groups have accused Chisholm of being a Marxist or a Communist or subversive. Others placed Chisholm among three prominent Humanists who early on headed important United Nations agencies: Julian Huxley of UNESCO and John Boyd-Orr of the Food and Agriculture Organization (FAO). At least one conservative women's group in Southern California considered Chisholm to be the Anti-Christ.

Personal and death

On 21 June 1924, Chisholm married Grace McLean Ryrie. They had two children, Catherine Anne and Brock Ryrie.

On 4 February 1971, Chisholm died age 74 in Veterans' Hospital, Victoria, British Columbia, after a series of strokes.

Honors, awards

Chisholm's honors and awards include:

 1945: Medal of the Pasteur Institute
 1953: Lasker Award
 1957: Honorary President of the World Federalist Movement-Canada
 1959: Humanist of the Year (American Humanist Association)
 1967: Companion of the Order of Canada

He was an Honorary Fellow of the Royal Society of Medicine, of the American Psychiatric Association, and the American Public Health Association among others.

Legacy

At his death, the New York Times remembered Chisholm as a "small-town doctor who became director general of the World Health Organization" and also called him "Prophet of Disaster."

Historica Canada notes he was an early leader in warning about the "danger of pollution, overpopulation, and the nuclear arms race."

Works

 Social responsibility, and three memorial papers by Gordon W. Allport (New York: Association Press, 1948)
 World health problems. Barriers to world health (New York: Carnegie Endowment for International Peace, 1953)
 Nations are learning to live together (Vancouver: University of British Columbia, 1954)
 Prescription for survival (New York: Columbia University Press, 1957)
 Can people learn to learn? How to know each other (New York: Harper, 1958)

See also

 World Health Organization (WHO)
 Surgeon General (Canada)
List of books, articles and documentaries about snipers

References

External links 

 Smithsonian Institution Archives: Photo of Brock Chisholm
 Canadian Great War Project Captain George Brock Chisholm
 .
 Biography and News Stories
 Biography
 World Health Organization Biography
 
Generals of World War II

Canadian psychiatrists
Canadian military personnel of World War I
University of Toronto alumni
Canadian agnostics
Canadian Unitarians
Canadian secularists
Companions of the Order of Canada
1896 births
1971 deaths
Canadian recipients of the Military Cross
People from Oakville, Ontario
Canadian Expeditionary Force officers
Surgeons General of Canada
Canadian Commanders of the Order of the British Empire
World Health Organization officials
Mind control theorists
Canadian officials of the United Nations
Canadian Army generals of World War II
Canadian generals
Canadian military personnel from Ontario
Yale University alumni
Royal Canadian Army Medical Corps officers
48th Highlanders of Canada